Kim Ji-woo (born October 20, 1999), known professionally as Chuu, is a South Korean singer and television personality. She is a former member of the girl group Loona and its sub-unit, yyxy.

Early life
Chuu was born on October 20, 1999, in Cheongju, North Chungcheong, South Korea. She is the eldest of three children, with two younger brothers. For her audition she sang "Halo" by Beyoncé. Her stage name "Chuu" is derived from saying her given name quickly. She graduated from Cheongju's Saet-byul Elementary school and San-nam Middle school.

Career

Loona

On December 14, 2017, Chuu was revealed as the tenth member of the Korean idol girl group Loona. As part of the group's pre-debut release strategy, on December 28, she released her self-titled single album with "Heart Attack" as its title track. Chuu reached number 8 on the Gaon Album Chart. She was introduced as part of Loona's third sub-unit Loona yyxy. The sub-unit includes members Yves, Gowon and Olivia Hye, and their EP, Beauty & the Beat, was released on May 30, 2018, reached number 4 on the Gaon Album Chart. She officially debuted with the whole group on August 20 with the EP [+ +], which peaked at number 2 on the Gaon Album Chart.  On November 25, 2022, BlockBerry Creative announced the departure of Chuu from Loona.

Removal from Loona
On November 25, 2022, Loona's agency, Blockberry Creative, announced on the official fancafe that Chuu will be expelled from Loona, explaining that "there were reports of abuse of power, such as Chuu’s abusive language towards our staff, and the investigation has revealed the fact, and the company representative is apologizing and comforting the staff." Chuu has recently been caught up in rumors of power abuse, transfer, and bullying within her company. However, the company refused to reveal evidence concerning the rumors of power abuse to the public. At the end of 2021, she filed an application for a provisional injunction against her agency, Blockberry Creative, to suspend the exclusive contract. It was also reported that last April, she founded her own company, with herself as the CEO.

Television career
On May 10, 2019, Chuu made her acting debut and starred in the web drama Dating Class as Han Eun-sol. In July to September, she co-hosted the second season of the variety show Insane Quiz Show with MJ of Astro and Il-hoon of BtoB. The show brings in two celebrity guests each episode and have them partake with them in various challenges.

In January 2020, Chuu appeared at MBC's 2020 Lunar New Year Idol Star Championships. However, MBC was inundated with criticism because it was discovered that a male staff pulled her hair.

In March 2020, Chuu competed in King of Mask Singer under the name "Spring Girl", a character who dressed in a spring outfit with flowers in her hair and a flat paper mask that covers her eyes and mouth. She was eliminated in the second of the two days of competition. In December, she co-starred in Running Girls, a Mnet show where five K-pop idols form a running team and try out different running courses in South Korea.

In March 2021, Chuu was a regular panelist in the Channel A show Steel Troops where she comments on teams from Korea's armed forces competing against each other. She appeared as a model for a television commercial of Dong-a Otsuka's Pocari Sweat. She also appeared in a television commercial of Samsung Galaxy Store in May 2021, South Korean chicken brand "Chicken Maru", mobile RTS game "Warpath", and BC Card. She participated in the reality documentary show Law of the Jungle for the episodes titled "Spring Special in Jeju".

Musical career
On June 27, 2022, Chuu released the single "Lullaby" with B.I as a collaboration with Dingo Music. On August 11, it was announced that Chuu would release "One and Half", a remake of the 1994 track by Two Two, on September 4. On October 16, Chuu released a remake of the 1999 Park Hye-kyung's song "Confession" as the theme song of the 2022 film Similar. On December 5, 2022, Chuu released "Dear My Winter" with South Korean R&B singer George as part of Lotte Shopping's "Songs for You" series.

On February 23, 2023, Chuu released "Let's Love" with Kim Yo-han, which is part of Project Restless.

Other ventures
In addition to singing and participating in television shows, Chuu hosts her own web series on YouTube called Chuu Can Do It where she spreads awareness about the need to protect the Earth through environmentally friendly practices. In 2021, Chuu hosted Hauteur, a web series that was made in collaboration with Lotte Department Store to help promote their store among generation Z.

Philanthropy 
On December 28, 2022, Chuu announced through her YouTube channel that all proceeds from the merchandise sold at the Jiwoo store were donated to the Korea Music Power Plant to improve the welfare of musicians.

Personal life
In February 2018, Chuu graduated from Hanlim Multi Art School alongside her Loona groupmate Kim Lip.

Bullying allegations
In the wake of a wave of bullying allegations against various stars in the K-pop industry, Chuu was one of the people accused of bullying at school in February 2021. However, the accuser apologized for the false claims as they were found to be unfounded after her agency, Blockberry Creative, announced that they would be taking legal action against the accuser.

Discography

Singles

Promotional singles

Soundtrack appearances

Filmography

Television series

Web series

Television shows

Web shows

Music videos

Awards and nominations

Notes

References

External links 
 

1999 births
Living people
21st-century South Korean women singers
South Korean women pop singers
South Korean female idols
South Korean dance music singers
South Korean television personalities
South Korean YouTubers
English-language singers from South Korea
Japanese-language singers of South Korea
Dance-pop musicians
People from Cheongju
Hanlim Multi Art School alumni
Gimhae Kim clan
Loona (group)